The Church of Our Lady of Sorrows, popularly known as Iglesia del Reducto (in current times it belongs to the barrio La Figurita, but in the past it was part of Reducto), is a Roman Catholic parish church in Montevideo, Uruguay.

The parish was established on 20 November 1871.

The present temple was built in 1875 and completed in 1877  and is dedicated to Our Lady of Sorrows.

Same devotion
There are other churches in Uruguay dedicated to the Virgin of Sorrows:
 Church of Our Lady of Sorrows, Larrañaga, Montevideo
 Church of Our Lady of Sorrows in Pan de Azúcar
 Church of Our Lady of Sorrows in Dolores
 Parish Church of Our Lady of Sorrows and St. Isidore the Laborer in Libertad

References

1871 establishments in Uruguay
Roman Catholic churches completed in 1877
Roman Catholic church buildings in Montevideo
19th-century Roman Catholic church buildings in Uruguay
Our Lady of Sorrows